Kisdorf is an Amt ("collective municipality") in the district of Segeberg, in Schleswig-Holstein, Germany. The seat of the Amt is in Kattendorf.

The Amt Kisdorf consists of the following municipalities:

Hüttblek 
Kattendorf
Kisdorf 
Oersdorf 
Sievershütten 
Struvenhütten 
Stuvenborn 
Wakendorf II
Winsen

References

Ämter in Schleswig-Holstein
Segeberg